Televisão Pública de Angola E.P. (Public Television of Angola) or TPA is the national broadcaster of the Southern African state of Angola. It also operates an international channel TPAi (formerly known as TPA Internacional and TPA3). TPA is headquartered in the capital city Luanda and broadcasts in the Portuguese language. The international channel broadcasts selected shows targeted at foreign audiences and the Angolan community abroad.

History
Before the creation of TPA, some experiments were made in the colonial era of Angola: the first was made in 1962, from Rádio Clube do Huambo. On January 8, 1964, Rádio Clube de Benguela made the second experiment, and then, on June 22, 1970, Luanda tested television for the first time.

It was founded on June 27, 1973 under the official designation of '''Radiotelevisão Portuguesa de Angola by the Portuguese colonial government authorities. The first television signal was launched on October 18, 1975, in Luanda. Less than a year after the official launch and the country's independence, the company first changed its name to Televisão Popular de Angola on June 25, 1976.

In 1979, TPA began studying expansion, starting in Benguela, then in 1981 in Huambo. It was in Huambo that the first regional production center was established.

In 1982, TPA started producing programming in native languages, the first two being Malanje and N'Dalatando. Currently, the so-called "national mother tongues" have a special focus on news, of which there is a dedicated block on the main generalist channel.

Color television arrived in Angola in 1983.

In 1992, TPA expanded to the entire country thanks to satellite connections.

In September 1997, TPA became a public company and the official name changed to Televisão Pública de Angola.

On August 15th 2000, TPA 2 started broadcasting regularly. Broadcasts only became official after two years. It was restructured in late January 2008, bringing new graphics, and a new programming grid, which remained on air until December 31, 2017.

In 2003, TPA channels started broadcasting through the KU band, launching the channels on the international African platform, DStv.

On January 31, 2007, TPA began broadcasting 24 hours a day.

On July 24th 2008, TPA international was launched and became available on the main cable and IPTV platforms in Portugal and in other countries.

On May 30 2022, TPA changed its broadcasting system from SD to HD, after 46 years of use. In addition, renovations were inaugurated at the Camama Program Production Center, with a Content Center and Complex named after Ernesto Bartolomeu, the acclaimed Angolan journalist who has been working since 1984. In addition, this center has a studio in 'chroma key' format, has a new studio for information services. On July 18, 2022, the first news channel in the country, TPA Notícias, will be inaugurated

Channels

TPA1 - the main and generalist channel. And also is currently the only state-owned broadcaster in Angola following the arrival of private channels TV Zimbo and Palanca TV;

TPA2 - the entertainment and culture channel for children, teenagers and adults;
TPA Notícias - is a channel for the exhibition of news blocks, and also opinion debates, public utility information, documentaries or reports, etc;
TPA Internacional - for foreign audiences outside Angola.

See also
 Media in Angola

References

External links
Official website (in Portuguese)
 
 
 
 

 
Publicly funded broadcasters
Television stations in Angola
Portuguese-language television networks
Portuguese-language television stations
Television channels and stations established in 1973
State media